Leo Gaetano Giacomo Frigo (July 3, 1931 – February 13, 2001) was a civic and philanthropic leader in the Green Bay, Wisconsin, area.

Life
Frigo was born on July 3, 1931, to Pasquale Frigo and Camilla née Rocheleau Frigo in Pound, Wisconsin. His father established the Frigo Brothers cheese company of Iron Mountain together with his four brothers in 1939. Leo Frigo eventually became director of the company's Lena plant, the Frigo Cheese Corporation, and then its president. He retired from the company in 1983. He died on February 13, 2001, due to injuries from a car accident while delivering food to the needy.

Legacy
Frigo's legacy includes one of the largest food pantry programs in the nation for feeding the hungry, Paul's Pantry.  After his death the Leo Frigo Memorial Bridge, a major bridge in Green Bay, was renamed in his honor.

References

External links

1931 births
2001 deaths
People from Marinette County, Wisconsin
People from Green Bay, Wisconsin
Businesspeople from Wisconsin
20th-century American businesspeople